Ma Yinchu (1882–1982) was a prominent Chinese economist. He was the father of China's family planning.

Biography

Early life
Ma Yinchu was born in Sheng County, Shaoxing, Zhejiang. He was the fifth child of the owner of a small distillery that specialized in fermented rice liquor. While his father wished for him to carry on this business, Ma showed an inclination toward scholarship. As a result, his father cut him off financially, and their relationship never recovered. His Christian uncle enlisted Ma into a Protestant church middle school in Shanghai. Despite losing his father's support, he studied mining and metallurgy at Beiyang University (now called Tianjin University). In 1907, Ma received government sponsorship to study economics at Yale University, after which he received a Ph.D. in economics and philosophy from Columbia University in 1914. At Columbia, Ma studied New York City’s finances.

When he returned to China, Ma sought to promote Western ideas of fiscal policy and banking. In 1920 he helped to found the Shanghai College of Commerce, and in 1923 he became the founding president of the Chinese Economics Society. During the 1930s, Ma began to criticize the Kuomintang government under Chiang Kai-shek, and was subsequently placed under house arrest from 1940 to 1942. In 1949, at the request of Zhou Enlai, he served as a nonpartisan delegate to the Chinese People's Political Consultative Conference. From 1950 to 1951, he served as the president of Zhejiang University, and then as the president of Peking University from 1951 to 1960. In this position, Ma was well liked, and seen as warm and genuine by his students. However, he was removed due to his unorthodox economic views.

New Population Theory
In June 1957, at the fourth session of the First National People's Congress, Ma presented his New Population Theory. Having examined trends of the early 1950s, he concluded that further population growth at such high rates would be detrimental to China's development. Therefore, he advocated government control of fertility. During the following three years, Ma's theory suffered two rounds of attacks, and he was dismissed from public life. The charges of the government were that the theory followed Malthusianism, attempted to discredit the superiority of socialism, and showed contempt for the people.

Rehabilitation and later life
Ma's New Population Theory did not receive mention in the People's Daily again until June 5, 1979. On July 26 of the same year, the Central Committee of the Communist Party of China formally apologized to him, stating that events had validated his theory. In September 1979, all charges against him were retracted, and he was made honorary president of Peking University. Ma Yinchu died on May 10, 1982 due to heart and lung disease and pneumonia.

Legacy
Even before Ma's death, scholars were realizing the enormity of the government's error in censoring his views for two decades. This view can be demonstrated by the title of a newspaper article published in 1979: "Erroneously criticized one person, population mistakenly increased 300,000,000". Ma's theory also became enshrined in public policy; China's One Child Policy draws heavily on Ma's reasoning that "the State should have the power to intervene in reproduction and to control population", and follows his advice in heavily utilizing propaganda on the dangers of population growth. In Ma's hometown, a middle school has been named in his honor. His birth home is being renovated as a museum, and the street on which it resides is now called "Famous Man Street". Nationally, the scholar is featured prominently in primary and middle school textbooks as "Uncle Ma", where he is praised for his contributions to population control and environmental protection. In 1997, a nine-part series about his life was aired in commemoration of the 40th anniversary of the publication of his population theory.

References

Republic of China economists
Chinese demographers
Columbia Graduate School of Arts and Sciences alumni
Academic staff of the National Central University
Academic staff of Nanjing University
Academic staff of Zhejiang University
1882 births
1982 deaths
People from Shengzhou
Birth control activists
Members of Academia Sinica
Tianjin University alumni
One-child policy
Presidents of Peking University
Presidents of Zhejiang University
Educators from Shaoxing
People's Republic of China economists
Economists from Zhejiang